Eumerus is a genus of hoverflies (family Syrphidae), within the tribe Eumerini.

They are small with a distinctive smooth round abdomen, powerful back legs and yellow hairs around the scutellum. Others have a dark scutellum and yellow antennae. They have a flat hairy face and a reentrant upper crossvein on the wings. Some species are pests of ornamental flowers. The genus contains 281 known species, making it one of the largest genera of flies.

Description 
Eumerus species are small to medium (5–12 mm), black hoverflies with a smooth wide, almost cylindrical body. The hind legs are remarkably powerful. They have compound eyes with fine hairs that in the male cover most of the head, but in the female are parted over the forehead. The antennae are quite short, dark coloured or orange. The face is flat with downwardly directed hairs. The thorax has a few light longitudinal stripes on its back which are more visible in the front half. The legs are yellowish, or white and black, with the upper back legs usually greatly thickened (except Eumerus flavitarsis), the lower part being curved and sharp, with expanded feet. The abdomen is roughly cylindrical, and clearly constricted at the boundaries between the various parts. The second, third and fourth part has silvery white or yellow oblique spots. In some species, the entire abdomen is a reddish brown. The wings are covered with fine hairs (microtrichia) on the entire surface.  Otherwise they are clear except for a brown-black wing mark.  The front cross-vein along the outer edge of the wing has a pronounced kink in the middle.

Gallery

Taxonomy

Species 

 Eumerus acuticornis Sack, 1933
 Eumerus ahmadii Barkalov-Gharali, 2005
 Eumerus albifacies Keiser, 1971
 Eumerus amoenus Loew, 1848
 Eumerus angustifrons Loew, 1848
 Eumerus argyropsis Bezzi, 1908
 Eumerus argyropus Loew, 1848
 Eumerus aristatus Peck, 1969
 Eumerus armenorum Stackelberg, 1960
 Eumerus armipes Bezzi, 1915
 Eumerus assimilis Doesburg, 1955
 Eumerus astropilops Hull, 1964
 Eumerus astrovarius Speiser, 1913
 Eumerus aurifrons (Wiedemann, 1824)
 Eumerus axinecerus Speiser, 1910
 Eumerus barbarus (Coquebert, 1804)
 Eumerus basalis Loew, 1848
 Eumerus bayardi Séguy, 1961
 Eumerus bernhardi Lindner, 1969
 Eumerus bequaerti Herve-Bazin, 1913
 Eumerus bidentatus Keiser, 1971
 Eumerus breijeri Doesburg, 1955
 Eumerus brincki Hull, 1964
 Eumerus caballeroi Gil Collado, 1929
 Eumerus canariensis Báez, 1982
 Eumerus capensis (Curran, 1938)
 Eumerus claripennis Coe, 1957
 Eumerus clavatus Becker, 1923
 Eumerus coeruleus (Becker, 1913)
 Eumerus compactus Doesburg, 1966
 Eumerus connexus Hull, 1964
 Eumerus consimilis Simic & Vujic, 1996
 Eumerus discimanus Keiser, 1971
 Eumerus dolichocerus Speiser, 1915
 Eumerus dubius Báez, 1982
 Eumerus dux Violovitsh, 1981
 Eumerus efflatouni (Curran, 1938)
 Eumerus elaverensis Séguy, 1961
 Eumerus emarginatus Loew, 1848
 Eumerus erythrocerus Loew, 1858
 Eumerus etnenstttis van der Goot, 1964
 Eumerus excisus van der Goot, 1968
 Eumerus falsus Becker, 1922
 Eumerus feae Bezzi, 1912
 Eumerus figurans Walker, 1859
 Eumerus flavitarsis Zetterstedt, 1843
 Eumerus fumipennis Hull, 1964
 Eumerus funeralis Meigen, 1822 – Lesser Bulb Fly 
 Eumerus graecus Becker, 1921
 Eumerus grandis Meigen, 1822
 Eumerus griseus Hull, 1964
 Eumerus gussakovskii Stackelberg, 1949
 Eumerus hispanicus van der Goot, 1966
 Eumerus hungaricus Szilády, 1940
 Eumerus hypopygialis Doesburg, 1966
 Eumerus imitatus Doesburg, 1955
 Eumerus integer Bezzi, 1921
 Eumerus jacobsoni Becker, 1913
 Eumerus japonicus Matsumura, 1916
 Eumerus keizeri Hull, 1964
 Eumerus kondarensis Stackelberg, 1952
 Eumerus lasiops Rondani, 1857
 Eumerus latitarsis Macquart in Webb & Berthelot, 1839
 Eumerus longicornis Loew, 1855
 Eumerus lucidus Loew, 1848
 Eumerus lugens Wiedemann, 1930
 Eumerus lunatus (Fabricius, 1794)
 Eumerus macropygus Keiser, 1971
 Eumerus maculipennis Bezzi, 1915
 Eumerus malagasius Keiser, 1971
 Eumerus metatarsalis Doesburg, 1955
 Eumerus minotaurus Claussen & Lucas, 1988
 Eumerus muscidus Bezzi, 1921
 Eumerus narcissi Smith, 1928
 Eumerus nebrodensis Rondani, 1868
 Eumerus niehuisi Doczkal, 1996
 Eumerus niger Doesburg, 1955
 Eumerus nigroapicalis Keiser, 1971
 Eumerus nigrocoeruleus Hull, 1964
 Eumerus nivariae Báez, 1982
 Eumerus niveitibia Becker, 1921
 Eumerus nodosus Hull, 1964
 Eumerus nudus Loew, 1848
 Eumerus obliquus (Fabricius, 1805)
 Eumerus obscurus Hull, 1964
 Eumerus obtusiceps Hull, 1964
 Eumerus okinawaensis Shiraki, 1930
 Eumerus olivaceus Loew, 1848
 Eumerus ornatus Meigen, 1822
 Eumerus ovatus Loew, 1848
 Eumerus parasiticus (Séguy, 1955)
 Eumerus paulae Herve-Bazin, 1913
 Eumerus pauper Becker, 1921
 Eumerus persarum Stackelberg, 1961
 Eumerus persicus Stackelberg, 1949
 Eumerus pipizoides Speiser, 1915
 Eumerus platycheiroides Keiser, 1971
 Eumerus pulchellus Loew, 1848
 Eumerus pumilio Hull, 1964
 Eumerus purpureus Macquart in Webb & Berthelot, 1839
 Eumerus pusillus Loew, 1848
 Eumerus quadrimaculatus Macquart, 1855
 Eumerus ribidus Hull, 1964
 Eumerus richteri Stackelberg, 1960
 Eumerus rubiginosus Herve-Bazin, 1913
 Eumerus rudebecki Hull, 1964
 Eumerus ruficornis Meigen, 1822
 Eumerus rufipes Herve-Bazin, 1913
 Eumerus rusticus Sack, 1932
 Eumerus sabulonum (Fallén, 1817)
 Eumerus sakarahaensis Keiser, 1971
 Eumerus santosabreui Báez, 1982
 Eumerus scaber Bezzi, 1915
 Eumerus serratus Bezzi, 1915
 Eumerus sicilianus van der Goot, 1968
 Eumerus signatus Keiser, 1971
 Eumerus sinuatus Loew, 1855
 Eumerus sogdianus Stackelberg, 1952
 Eumerus speiseri Hull, 1964
 Eumerus spinifer Doesburg, 1955
 Eumerus strigatus (Fallén, 1817) – Lesser Bulb Fly 
 Eumerus subcaeruleus Keiser, 1971
 Eumerus sudanus (Curran, 1938)
 Eumerus sulcitibius Rondani, 1868
 Eumerus tadzhicorum Stackelberg, 1949
 Eumerus tarsalis Loew, 1848
 Eumerus tauricus Stackelberg, 1952
 Eumerus terminalis Santos Abréu, 1924
 Eumerus tessellatus Hull, 1964
 Eumerus toamasinaensis Keiser, 1971
 Eumerus triangularis Herve-Bazin, 1913
 Eumerus tricolor (Fabricius, 1798)
 Eumerus tridentatus Keiser, 1971
 Eumerus tumidipes Doesburg, 1966
 Eumerus tuberculatus Rondani, 1857
 Eumerus uncipes Rondani, 1850
 Eumerus unicolor Loew, 1858
 Eumerus vandenberghei Doczkal, 1996
 Eumerus vansoni Doesburg, 1955
 Eumerus varipennis (Curran, 1938)
 Eumerus vestitus Bezzi, 1912
 Eumerus villeneuvei Herve-Bazin, 1913
 Eumerus wainwrighti (Curran, 1938)

References

External links 

Hoverfly genera
Eristalinae
Taxa named by Johann Wilhelm Meigen